The Giants of Jazz is a live album of an English concert recorded at Victoria Theatre in London in two concerts on the same date, November 14, 1971, by Art Blakey, Dizzy Gillespie, Al McKibbon, Thelonious Monk, Sonny Stitt, and Kai Winding, who were billed as The Giants of Jazz. The album was released by the Atlantic.

Reception

The Allmusic review called the album "A historic and superlative set".

Track listing
 "Tin Tin Deo" (Gil Fuller, Chano Pozo) – 11:42
 "Night in Tunisia" (Dizzy Gillespie, Felix Paparelli) – 10:22
 "Woody 'n' You" (Gillespie) – 8:34
 "Tour de Force" (Gillespie) – 13:22
 "Allen's Alley (Be Bop Tune)" (Denzil Best) – 8:38
 "Blue 'n' Boogie" (Gillespie, Frank Paparelli) – 13:50
 "Everything Happens to Me" (Tom Adair, Matt Dennis) – 4:52
 Dizzy's Rap – 1:09
 "Blue Monk" (Thelonious Monk) – 9:44
 "'Round Midnight" (Monk) – 8:19

Personnel
Dizzy Gillespie – trumpet
Kai Winding – trombone
Sonny Stitt – saxophone
Al McKibbon – double bass
Thelonious Monk – piano
Art Blakey – drums

References 

Atlantic Records live albums
Dizzy Gillespie live albums
Art Blakey live albums
Sonny Stitt live albums
Thelonious Monk live albums
Kai Winding albums
1972 live albums
Collaborative albums